Diether Sweeck (born 17 December 1993 in Leuven) is a Belgian cyclist, who currently rides for UCI Continental team  in road cycling, and UCI Cyclo-cross team Credishop–Fristads in cyclo-cross.

Sweeck is the grandson of former cyclist Alfons Sweeck. His twin brother Laurens Sweeck and his older brother Hendrick Sweeck are also professional cyclists.

Major results

2009–2010
 1st VII Ciclocross de Villarcayo Juniors
 1st VII Ciclocross de Medina de Pomar Juniors
2010–2011
 Superprestige Under-23
1st Hoogstraten
2nd Hamme-Zogge
2nd Noordzeecross
 Gazet van Antwerpen Under-23
1st Grand Prix van Hasselt
2011–2012
 1st VIII Cyclo-cross de Medina de Pomar
2013–2014
 3rd Kasteelcross Zonnebeke
2014–2015
 BPost Bank Trophy Under-23
1st Grand Prix van Hasselt
2nd Azencross
 1st Internationale Sluitingsprijs Oostmalle Under-23
 2nd Cyclo-cross International de Nommay
 6th UEC European Under-23 Championships
 8th UCI Under-23 World Championships
2015–2016
 3rd Kasteelcross Zonnebeke
2016–2017
 2nd Uničov, Toi Toi Cup
 3rd Jingle Cross
2017–2018
 2nd Kasteelcross Zonnebeke
 2nd Kolín, Toi Toi Cup
 2nd Clif Bar Cross Vegas
2018–2019
 1st Jingle Cross #1
 Toi Toi Cup
1st Mladá Boleslav
1st Kolín
 3rd Kasteelcross Zonnebeke
 3rd Gran Premi Internacional ciutat de Vic
2019–2020
 Toi Toi Cup
1st Kolín
1st Uničov
 2nd Elorrioko Basqueland Ziklokrosa
 2nd Rochester Cyclocross

References

External links

1993 births
Living people
Belgian male cyclists
Sportspeople from Leuven
Cyclists from Flemish Brabant
Cyclo-cross cyclists
Twin sportspeople
Belgian twins
21st-century Belgian people